Gulshan-e-Maymar is one of the neighbourhoods of Gadap Town in Karachi, Sindh, Pakistan.

The concept of Gulshan-e-Maymar originated in the late 1970s – the venture was formally launched in 1980. The core philosophy driving the establishment of this township was to provide a model, master-planned community for Karachi's populace in a suburban setting. The township was planned from scratch, with a focus on building into the master plan amenities and services that were not available elsewhere in the city. Generous allocation were made for parks, mosques, clubs, health and education facilities, etc. to allow residents to feel self-contained within the bounds of the township. In essence, Gulshan-e-Maymar represented a microcosm of Maymar's management's utopian world.

Having gone through 13 phases of extensions and development, Gulshan-e-Maymar currently stands at 1023 acres. Its population today is at 45% of its optimal capacity of 100,000, which is the number around which all the amenities and services have been planned. The township has witnessed significant growth in recent years due to its quaint setting, plethora of amenities, relatively low air and noise pollution, and access to one of the major freeways of the country. At its current growth rate, the township will get close to its capacity figure by 2012. The significant growth of this township has resulted in exponential appreciation of real estate prices within it – this trend is expected to continue in the foreseeable future as evidenced by the growth projections and the lack of alternative townships with similar facilities and amenities.

Gulshan-e-Maymar township is situated just off the Super Highway (main highway between Karachi and Hyderabad) in MDA Scheme 45 (and partly in MDA scheme 33) in Karachi. It is about ten kilometers north-east of Sohrab Goth / F.B. Area and approximately 15 kilometers from the Expo Center. Its postal code is 75340.

Ayub Shah Bukhari was a Sufi master and his shrine is located in Gulshan-e-Maymar.

See also 
 Ahsanabad
 Darsano Chana
 Gabol Town
 Gadap
 Gujro
 Gadap Town
 Gulshan-e-Sheraz
 Khuda Ki Basti
 Manghopir Hills
 Manghopir
 Maymarabad
 Murad Memon Goth
 Songal
 Surjani Town
 Yousuf Goth
 Sohrab Goth
 Fizan City
 Abdullah Baloch Goth
 Baloch Khan Goth
 Multan
 tharu mangal goth

References

Neighbourhoods of Karachi